Acharya Chatursen Shastri (26 August 1891 – 2 February 1960) was an Indian writer of Hindi literature. He wrote many historical fictions, including Vaishali ki Nagarvadhu adapted into a feature film (1948), Vayam Rakshamah (1951), Somnath (1954), and Dharamputra which was adapted into the 1961 feature film of the same name.

Biography
Acharya Chatursen Shastri was born in a small village Aurangabad Chandok (near Anupshahr) in the Bulandshahr district of Uttar Pradesh state in India on 26 August 1891. His father was Punditt Kewal Ram Thakur and mother was Nanhee Devi. His birth name was Chaturbhuj.

Chaturbhuj finished his primary education in a school in Sikandrabad. Then he got admitted to Sanskrit College, Jaipur, Rajasthan. From here he received the degrees of Ayurvedacharya in Ayurveda and Shastri in Sanskrit in the year 1915. He also received the degree of Ayurvedacharya from Ayurveda Vidyapeetha.

After finishing his education he came to Delhi to start his practice as an ayurvedic physician. He opened his own ayurvedic dispensary in Delhi but it did not run well and he had to close it down. He joined a rich man's charitable dispensary at the salary of rupees 25 per month. Later in 1917, he joined DAV College, Lahore (now in Pakistan) as senior professor of Ayurveda. The management at the DAV college, Lahore was insulting to him, therefore, he resigned and went to Ajmer to help his father-in-law in his dispensary. Working at this dispensary, he started to write and soon became famous as a story writer and novelist.

His first novel Hridaya-Ki-Parakh (Trial of the Heart) was published in 1918. It did not bring him any recognition. His second book, Satyagraha Aur Asahyoga (Civil Resistance and Non-cooperation) was published in 1921. This brought immense attention to Acharya Chatursen Shastri. These were followed by many historical novels, stories and ayurvedic books.

Acharya Chatursen Shastri took his last breath on 2 February 1960.

Career
His books present an idealistic view of the ancient period as can be seen clearly in his famous book Purnahuti. In this book he gives a eulogical account of Prithiviraj Chauhan's life and the battles fought. They are not historical but give details of life in ancient India. These books can be seen as a logical binding of history and philosophy and are worth recommending to anyone who is looking to know more about India before the advent of Islam. In his foreword to his book, 'Vaishali ki Nagarvadhu', he declares this is his first book and the ones prior to this one as worthless; the book lives up to this declaration. It is hard to imagine a more readable description of society and politics in India around sixth century BC.

He was a friend of Jawaharlal Nehru, India's first Prime Minister.

Writings
The bulk of his literary output is almost unparalleled in Hindi. In all, he wrote 72 published books including 8 historical novels, 10 dramas, 4 historical non-fictions, 15 collections of essays on political subjects and an equal number on the subjects of health and medicine. He also published over 250 short stories in various Hindi periodicals over time. His novel Dharamputra was adapted into the Hindi film, Dharmputra (1961) by Yash Chopra, it won the National Film Award for Best Feature Film in Hindi.

His important works include:
 Vaishali ki Nagarvadhu (वैशाली की नगरवधू) (1948?)  - based on the historical figure Amrapali
 Vayam Rakshamah (वयं रक्षाम:) - based on life of character of Ravana (from Ramayana)
 Sahyadri ki chattanen - based on Shivaji's times and life
 Goli (गोली)
 Dharamputra (धर्मपुत्र)
 Sona aur Khoon (सोना और ख़ून)
 Neelmani (नीलमणि)
 Narmedh (नरमेध)
 Somnath Mahalay (सोमनाथ) - Based on invasion of Mahmud Ghazni and destruction of Somnath temple
 Bharat mein Islam (भारत में इस्लाम)
 Achchi Aadatein (अच्छी आदतें)
 Aparajita (अपराजिता)
 Aadarsh Bhojan (आदर्श भोजन)
 Nirog Jivan (नीरोग जीवन)
 Eedo (ईदो) - based on events from The great Depression (1929–1934) and World War II (1939–1945)
 Hindi Bhasha aur Sahitya Ka Itihas (1946) - A History of Hindi Language and its literature
 Hridaya Ki Parakh (1918)
 Satyagraha Aur Asahyoga (1921) - about Civil Resistance and Non-cooperation

References

Bibliography

External links
 Review (in Hindi) of Dharamputra (धर्मपुत्र)  

Hindi-language writers
People from Bulandshahr district
1891 births
1960 deaths
Indian male novelists
Indian male dramatists and playwrights
Indian male essayists
Ayurvedacharyas
20th-century Indian novelists
20th-century Indian dramatists and playwrights
20th-century Indian essayists
Novelists from Uttar Pradesh
20th-century Indian male writers